EPTA may refer to:

 European Parliamentary Technology Assessment
 European Pulsar Timing Array
 Phosphotungstic acid
 Expanded Programme of Technical Assistance, a United Nations aid network
 European Piano Teachers Association